Dúbrava is a village and municipality in Liptovský Mikuláš District in the Žilina Region of northern Slovakia.

History
In historical records the village was first mentioned in 1372.

Geography
The municipality lies at an altitude of 636 metres and covers an area of 23.217 km². It has a population of about 1300 people.

Genealogical resources

The records for genealogical research are available at the state archive "Statny Archiv in Bratislava, Banska Bystrica, Bytca, Kosice, Levoca, Nitra, Presov, Slovakia"

 Roman Catholic church records (births/marriages/deaths): 1725-1896 (parish B)
 Lutheran church records (births/marriages/deaths): 1783-1895 (parish B)

See also
 List of municipalities and towns in Slovakia

External links
https://web.archive.org/web/20071217080336/http://www.statistics.sk/mosmis/eng/run.html
 Village website (in Slovak)
Surnames of living people in Dubrava

Villages and municipalities in Liptovský Mikuláš District